The Japanese anime television series Bokurano was based on the manga Bokurano: Ours by Mohiro Kitoh, about a group of middle-school students who unwillingly assume the task of piloting a giant mecha named Zearth in a series of battles against mechas from parallel worlds, where the survival of Earth is dependent on their continuing to win at the cost of the life of the pilot of each battle. The anime was directed by Hiroyuki Morita and produced by Gonzo, the series premiered on April 8, 2007 on Japan's Tokyo MX, Sun TV, and other stations. Episodes were released in Japan on eight DVDs between July 25, 2007 and March 26, 2008.

Episodes

See also
 List of Bokurano chapters
 List of Bokurano characters

References

External links
 Official Gonzo Bokurano website 

Bokurano